Dumaguete, officially the City of Dumaguete, is a 3rd income class component city and the capital of the province of Negros Oriental, Philippines. According to the 2020 census, it has a population of 134,103 people. It is the smallest in terms of land area yet the most populous among the cities and municipalities in the province of Negros Oriental.

Dumaguete is a university city, with four large universities and a number of other colleges, attracting students of the province, as well as students of surrounding provinces and cities in Visayas and Mindanao. The city is best known for Silliman University, the first Protestant and American university in the country and in Asia. There are also 18 public elementary schools and 8 public high schools.

The power source of the city comes from the geothermal power plant in Palinpinon, Valencia.

Scholars have been pushing for the city's inclusion in the tentative list of the Philippines for future UNESCO World Heritage Site nomination.

Etymology
"Dumaguete" was coined from the Cebuano word dagit, which means "to snatch". The word dumaguet, meaning "to swoop", was coined because of frequent raids by Moro pirates on this coastal community and its power to attract and keep visitors, both local and foreign. In 1572, Diego López Povedano indicated the place as Dananguet, but cartographer Pedro Murillo Velarde in 1734 already used present name of Dumaguete for the settlement.

History

Capital after division 
The island of Negros was divided into the provinces of Negros Oriental and Negros Occidental by a royal decree executed by Governor General Valeriano Weyler on January 1, 1890. Dumaguete was made the first and only capital of the new Negros Oriental Province.

Philippine Revolution 
During 1898, months after the arrival of Emilio Aguinaldo from exile, the Negros Revolution suddenly broke-out. Negros Occidental Province, which was still ruled by the Spanish authorities, eventually surrendered to the Negrense Revolutionary Forces after a battle on November 6. They then began a week-long march which captured Dumaguete on the 24th. By this time, the Spanish forces had left the entirety of Negros. The "Negros Republic" was then proclaimed on November 27.

World War II 
Imperial Japanese forces landed at Dumaguete on May 26, 1942, after the fall of the Philippines, and all of Negros Oriental Province surrendered shortly thereafter. Resistance against the Japanese occupation continued by guerilla groups in the inner mountains, where many native residents had fled to. The local Negrense guerillas attacked the remaining Japanese officials and troops on August 6, 1945, and after their victory they welcomed combined American and Filipino forces that formally liberated Negros Oriental.

Creation 
The City of Dumaguete was formally created on July 15, 1948, under Philippine Congressional Republic Act No. 327, also known as the "Charter of the City of Dumaguete". This was later amended on June 21, 1969, by Republic Act No. 5797, which clarified and refined the powers and functions of the local government unit in the earlier act.

Martial law 

Journalist Crispin Maslog who was teaching at Silliman University at the time, he notes that Dumaguete learned about Marcos' declaration of Martial Law earlier than other parts of the country did on September 23, 1972, because local news station DYSR was able to pick up the news from an Australian broadcast.  Elsewhere in the country, media outlets such as newspapers and broadcast stations had already been shut down, but DSYR was able to make the announcement before Information Secretary Francisco Tatad did at around noon. DYSR itself would be shut down later that day.

Maslog recounts that Silliman University in Dumaguete was one of the last four universities in the Philippines to be allowed to reopen for classes, with Marcos himself complaining about instances where members of the political opposition such as Senators Jovito Salonga, Juan Liwag were invited to speak at the University.

In the mid 1980s, the crony capitalism which characterized the Martial Law administration had a major effect on the island of Negros in which Dumaguete is located. A sugar hoarding scheme by National Sugar Trading Corporation (NASUTRA) of Roberto Benedicto backfired, resulting in the mass-firing of sugar workers in Negros Oriental and Negros Occidental. Worsened by the economic nosedive which had begun in 1983, it eventually became known as the 1985 Negros famine.

Geography and environment

Of the province's 19 municipalities/towns and 6 cities, Dumaguete is the smallest in terms of land area. It is bounded on the north by the town of Sibulan, on the south by the town of Bacong and on the west by the town of Valencia.

As a coastal city, it is bounded on the east by the Bohol Sea and the Tañon Strait, serving as a natural border of southeastern Negros Island Region to the neighboring Central Visayas. The city's topography is generally flat from two to six kilometers from the shoreline. It slopes gently upwards to the adjoining municipality of Valencia. The highest ground elevation is located at the boundary of the municipality of Valencia, about one hundred meters above mean sea level. About 93% of the land have slopes of less than 3%. The remaining areas have 3% to 5% slope.

Climate

Dumaguete has a tropical savannah climate, bordering a tropical monsoon climate according to the Köppen Climate classification with two distinct seasons: wet and dry. The wet season covers the period from June to November, and the dry season starts from December to May, the hottest being April and May. The average maximum temperature is 30.9 °C and the average minimum temperature is 24.8 °C for the 1991-2020 normals. The relative humidity of the locality for the past years was 81% with the month of January registering the highest.

Environment 
Dumaguete has a rich and unique marine ecosystem that provides livelihoods to fishers and supports tourism. The coastal environment, which includes seagrass meadows, acts as efficient carbon sinks that mitigate the effects of climate change. This ecosystem includes 36.15 hectares of seagrasses and 36.20 hectares of coral reef. Dumaguete has four marine protected areas covering 104 hectares that host over 200 species of fish.

The fragile marine ecosystem is under threat from a proposed  reclamation project that is facing opposition from youth organizations, church groups, residents, and environmental scientists, including Philippine national scientist and former environmental secretary Angel Alcala.

Barangays 

Dumaguete is politically subdivided into 30 barangays, all classified as urban. The eight barangays in the city's downtown area are known primarily by number. The smallest barangay is Barangay 4 with an area of only 5.11 hectares, while the biggest barangay is Barangay Banilad with 362.71 hectares.

 Bagacay
 Bajumpandan
 Balugo
 Banilad
 Bantayan
 Barangay Pob. 1 (Tinago)
 Barangay Pob. 2 (Upper Lukewright)
 Barangay Pob. 3 (Business District)
 Barangay Pob. 4 (Rizal Boulevard)
 Barangay Pob. 5 (Silliman Area)
 Barangay Pob. 6 (Cambagroy)
 Barangay Pob. 7 (Mangga)
 Barangay Pob. 8 (Cervantes Extension)
 Batinguel
 Buñao
 Cadawinonan
 Calindagan
 Camanjac
 Candau-ay
 Cantil-e
 Daro
 Junob
 Looc
 Mangnao-Canal
 Motong
 Piapi
 Pulantubig
 Tabuc-tubig
 Taclobo
 Talay

Demographics

As of the census in 2015, there are 131,377 people and 21,582 households residing in the city (as of 2010). The city has the least poverty incidence among urban centers in Visayas, according to the 2009 Small Area Estimates (SAE) of Poverty done by the National Statistical Coordination Board (NSCB). It has an average daylight population of 400,000 people. Dumaguete is the most populous city in Negros Oriental, comprising 9.05% of the province's total population. Its total voting population is 89,193 voters (2019).

The Philippine Retirement Authority, a government agency under the Department of Tourism, has named the city as the "Best Place to Retire in the Philippines for 2018". Dumaguete is also listed 5th in Forbes Magazine's "7 Best Places to Retire Around the World".

Economy

Industries 

Tourism, the academe, the retail industries, BPO and technology-related activities are the major sources of income of the city. BPOs and IT firms, as well as retailing, are the fastest rising industries. There are significant number of banking institutions and a branch of Bangko Sentral ng Pilipinas within its territory.

Business activities are mostly concentrated in the downtown area and bayside Rizal Boulevard with some prominent shopping centers such as Lee Super Plaza and Robinsons Townville Perdices but with the completion of 4 lanes circumferential highway known as Metro Dumaguete Diversion Road helps decongest the traffic in the main thoroughfares of Central Business District traversing from the town of Sibulan up to Bacong. The new highway is expected to economically benefit the outskirt barangays of the city as new growth centers with the opening of satellite market, South Bus Terminal, city satellite provincial hospital to name a few. These growing industries made Dumaguete the hub for shopping, education, financial, IT, commerce, lifestyle and sports in the province of Negros Oriental and region.

Real estate and infrastructure 
Real estate industry in the city is also booming with a number of constructions such as condominiums, town centers and massive horizontal housing projects. New shopping centers such as Marina Town Mall by Filinvest Group, Bayshores Dumaguete and popular restaurants, bars and dining strips along Flores Avenue (North Boulevard) have excellent views of Dumaguete Bay. CityMall Dumaguete, a community mall owned by DoubleDragon Properties and home grown Cang's Shopping Complex positioned along the national highway serving shoppers in the north. A Public Transport Terminal with multi-level parking spaces are being built at the back of Robinsons Place Dumaguete located inside Dumaguete Business Park.

Business process outsourcing

Dumaguete's outsourcing industry has a range of businesses, such as call centers, publishing, medical transcription, animation, editing, and architectural outsourcing. Dumaguete is listed among Next Wave Cities in the country with over 20 IT and BPO locators, and has been described as a hub for Business Process Outsourcing and Information Technology.

Cooperatives 
DCCCO (Dumaguete Cathedral Credit Cooperative) and PHCCI (Perpetual Help Community Cooperative) are among the prominent cooperatives in the country which are both rooted in Dumaguete.

Tourism

Data from the Department of Tourism show that Dumaguete, the province's main gateway, and Negros Oriental are listed among the top ten most visited tourist destinations in the country.

Historical Landmarks

Rizal Boulevard is known for its sugar mansions and prominent ancestral houses that are now mostly converted into hotels, local-based and nationally known coffee shops, fine-dining restaurants and bars. Dumaguete People's Park, a 1.9 hectares reclaimed area, is the newest attraction located at the south end of Rizal Boulevard. This area, so-called Pantawan 3 by the locals, is extended up to the mouth of Banica River will have sand courts and shoreline protection for the coastal barangay of Poblacion 1 Tinago.

Baywalk is the popular site of both locals and visitors for relaxing, dining and doing morning or late afternoon exercises. Food carts installed beside the Pantawan area sell Filipino street food such as balut, tempura, kikiam, fishballs and the like. The boulevard extension to the north from the city's port (where the name changes to Flores Avenue and Escaño Drive) are now dotted with new hotels, resort, restaurants and bars, with views of the bay and neighboring islands such as Cebu, Sumilon, Bohol on a clear weather and another angle of Siquijor.

The St. Catherine of Alexandria Cathedral is known as the oldest stone church of Negros Island and the home of ecclesiastical seat of the bishop of Roman Catholic Diocese of Dumaguete. The detached Campanario of the cathedral is considered one of the oldest heritage landmarks of Dumaguete and Central Visayas. Meanwhile, La Presidencia, the old City Hall, is being restored to its original design and will become a branch of the National Museum in Dumaguete. The cathedral, belfry, and museum are all located beside Quezon Park named after the Philippine first President of the Commonwealth, Manuel L. Quezon.

The Silliman Hall is home to the university's Anthropology Museum.

Festivals

One of the cities' important annual celebrations is the Sandurot Festival, which is held every September to commemorate Dumaguete's history. The celebration starts with the Paghimamat, a re-enactment of how people from different ethnic and cultural backgrounds came to Dumaguete, bringing gifts of rich cultures. Pasigarbo follows, gracing the city streets with dancing to drumbeats and other instruments participated by different barangays and schools in Dumaguete. The street dancing ends at Quezon Park after which the participants prepare for the grand Pasundayag, a display of dances portraying different stories of the Dumaguete tradition.

Another important annual occasion is the Buglasan Festival, also known locally as the "Festival of all festivals", which is held in the whole Negros Oriental province every October since 2002. Though this is a province-wide event sponsored by the provincial government, the activities are mostly centered in the province's capital, Dumaguete. Majority of activities are held in the Provincial Capitol and Ninoy Aquino Freedom Park with booths and local products either on display or for sale. It is also spread to other venues such as the Sidlakan Negros Village at Barangay Piapi and the city's Rizal Boulevard. Showdowns and street dancing are among the activities done in observance of the festival.

Healthcare 

Dumaguete has four major tertiary hospitals, namely the Holy Child Hospital (HCH), Negros Oriental Provincial Hospital, ACE Dumaguete Doctors Hospital and the Silliman University Medical Center which is currently associated with St. Luke's Medical Center in Metro Manila. The Dumaguete Health Office is responsible for the implementation and planning of the health care programs provided by the city government, which also operates and supervises Health Centers in the barangays of the city.

Transportation

Air

Sibulan Airport (IATA: DGT, ICAO: RPVD), also known as Dumaguete Airport or Dumaguete-Sibulan Airport, is the city's domestic airport located in neighboring Sibulan town in the north. It provides daily flights to and from Manila and Cebu City through Cebu Pacific, Cebgo and PAL Express while Cebgo is servicing both Mindanao important urban centers, thrice weekly flights to Davao City and Cagayan de Oro. However, a new airport is being planned to be built in Bacong, a town bordering Dumaguete in the south. The proposal for the transfer and upgrading of this airport to international standards has already been initially approved and should be completed before 2025. An initial PHP 500 million budget has already been released for initial study and procurement of free lands. In March 2021, while awaiting for final approval of the construction of the new airport in Bacong, upgrade works were made to the current Sibulan Airport which include pavement reconstruction, expansion of the terminal building from 1,152sqm. to 1,842sqm., and expansion of CAAP administrative buildings.

Sea

Dumaguete, as a major port city, is a jump-off point for passengers/tourists who are going to other Visayas and Mindanao areas. Currently, the port is equipped with two modern port operations and passenger terminal facilities. It is also the headquarters site of Coast Guard Station Negros Oriental under Philippine Coast Guard Central Visayas District.

As major point of Philippine Western Nautical Highway System, there are daily ferry connections to the islands of Cebu, Bohol, Siquijor and Mindanao operated by Archipelago Philippine Ferries Corporation (FastCat), Montenegro Lines, Medallion Transport, Ocean Jet Shipping, Lite Shipping, Cokaliong and other companies. Dumaguete is an access city for passengers/tourists going to Cebu City. Alternatively, there are smaller ports north of the city where short and frequent ferry connections mostly to Cebu Island are available. Dumaguete is a port of call for travelers to Manila, Dapitan and Zamboanga City by ship serviced by 2GO Travel.

Land
The main form of public transport in Dumaguete is the motorized tricycle. The Dumaguete version of the motorized tricycle can fit up to 6-8 passengers. For transport to destinations outside the city limit, there are jeepney and buses travelling set routes. Meanwhile, Vallacar Transit Corporation, the company that operates Ceres buses, recently constructed a 2-storey terminal building in Barangay Calindagan just beside the newly erected commercial center, the Marketplace. Buses from Dumaguete have routes going to Bacolod City/Negros Occidental, Cebu City/Cebu Province, Zamboanga City via Dipolog/Dapitan of Zamboanga Peninsula, Tagbilaran City/Bohol via Cebu and Cubao/Metro Manila using Western Nautical Highway.

Sports
Dumaguete has hosted numerous Asian, national, regional and provincial sports events, such as the 4th Asian University Basketball Federation (AUBF) 2005, the 2013 Palarong Pambansa, 2012 Philippine National Games (POC-PSC), Philippine Volleyball League, National Frisbee Championship, Batang Pinoy Visayas, Dumaguete Dragon Boat Challenge, Unigames, CVIRAA, the Palarong NIR for short-lived Negros Island Region among others. The Don Mariano Perdices Memorial Coliseum hosted the 2010 Central Visayas Regional Athletic Meet and 2013 Palarong Pambansa that was located in Dumaguete. Its capacity was 25,000 people with rubberized track oval, main lobby, dormitory, and hostel. Beside it is the Olympic size swimming pool known as the Lorenzo G. Teves Memorial Aqua Center. The Lamberto Macias Sports Complex is an indoor arena located near the coliseum which can accommodate around 6,000 people.

Education

Dumaguete is known as the "center of learning in the South," or a university city due to the presence of well-known universities.

• Silliman University (SU, 1901) is the dominant institution of higher learning in Dumaguete, providing the city with a university town atmosphere. It is the first Protestant university in the country and the first American university in Asia. The  campus is adjacent to and intermixed with the city's downtown district. Some of its buildings have likewise been recognized as landmarks, including the Silliman Hall, Hibbard Hall, Katipunan Hall, the Luce Auditorium, and the Silliman Main Library (considered one of the biggest libraries in the Philippines). CHED designated Center of Excellence for its Nursing, Teacher Education, Marine Science and Information Technology while Center of Development for its Anthropology, Biology, Accountancy and Medical Technology programs.

• Foundation University (FU, 1949) is a private non-sectarian university with its Main Campus located at Miciano Road, offering tertiary education programs, while the North Campus along Locsin Street is the home of Foundation Preparatory Academy for its basic education programs.

• Negros Oriental State University (NORSU, 1907) is the province's only state university, with two main campuses in the city. The Main Campus 1 is beside the Provincial Capitol building, while the Main Campus 2 is located in barangay Bajumpandan. It is the first academic institution in the country to offer BS Geothermal Engineering. CHED designated Center of Development for its Teacher Education program.

• St. Paul University Dumaguete (SPUD, 1904) is the first Saint Paul educational institution to be established in the Philippines by the Sisters of Saint Paul of Chartres (SPC) from France and second oldest Catholic university of Central Visayas. It is recognized by CHED as full autonomy status Higher Education Institution (HEI).

• Colegio de Santa Catalina de Alejandria (COSCA, 1959) run by Catholic Diocesan clergy is located beside the Dumaguete Cathedral Church. Formerly known as Dumaguete Cathedral College, it offers pre-school to college programs. Its flagship courses are Commerce/Business Administration, Criminology and Radiologic Technology.

• Metro Dumaguete College (MDC, 2002) is an academic institution with campus in Barangay Daro, offering Senior High School program, ladderized TESDA accredited Technical Vocational programs and other 4-year college courses.

Notable people

Sister cities

Dumaguete has the following sister cities:

Local
 Bacolod, Negros Occidental
 Mandaue, Cebu
 Butuan, Agusan del Norte
 Makati, Metro Manila

International
  Yeongdong County of North Chungcheong, Republic of Korea
  Alameda of California, United States

Gallery

References

External links

Official Website of the City of Dumaguete
 [ Philippine Standard Geographic Code]
Philippine Statistics Authority

 
Cities in Negros Oriental
Provincial capitals of the Philippines
Port cities and towns in the Philippines
Component cities in the Philippines